Vangelys Reinke Pereira (born 17 March 1991) is a Brazilian rower.

He won a medal at the 2019 World Rowing Championships.

References

External links

1991 births
Living people
Brazilian male rowers
World Rowing Championships medalists for Brazil
21st-century Brazilian people